Disphragis manethusa is a moth of the family Notodontidae first described by Herbert Druce in 1887. It is found in Central America.

References

Moths described in 1887
Notodontidae